Zinia Zafrin Luipa  (simply known by her nickname Luipa) is a Bangladeshi singer.

Biography

Personal life and education 
Luipa was born in Bogura. She completed her SSC in 2007 and HSC in 2009 from Bogra Cantonment Public School and College. She was married to "Alamgir Hossain" in 2013. She has one Child.

Career 
Luipa started to learn singing when she was three years old. She could memorize a full song at the age of three so her parents thought her to learn music. Besides music she learned other arts like dance, acting, and reciting at Bangladesh Shishu Academy. She participated in lots of national competitions at an early age and got 14 gold medals in singing. She participated in "Notun Kuri" and "Shapla Kuri" and became champion. In 2010 she participated on Channel-i shera kontho and she was one of the finalist and held in 4th position. After that her professional journey has started. She started to appear on television, open air concerts, tvc, mixed albums. Her solo album Chhayabazi was released on 2014. In 2017 she released her single track "Gentleman". In 2021 she released her new music video Rongila Hawa. Actor Ziaul Roshan acted in this music video along with luipa. In 2022 her new song Naach Moyuri Nacch has been released. This song is written and composed by Kaushik Hossain Taposh. Actress Nusrat Jahan acted in this music video.

Awards and nomination 

 RTV star award 2014 as a best promising singer.
 Meril-Prothom Alo award nomination for album "Chayabaji"
 Symphony Channel-i music award 2015 as new female vocalist.
 Shako telefilm award 2018 as best singer.

References

External links 

21st-century Bangladeshi women singers
21st-century Bangladeshi singers
Living people
People from Dhaka District
1992 births